The Serbian People's Radical Party (Serbian: Српска народна радикална странка, Srpska narodna radikalna stranka) was an ethnic Serb political party in Austria-Hungary. It was founded in 1887 in Novi Sad, but later disbanded in 1919. The party was a more radical fork of the Serbian People's Liberal Party, and also a sister party of the People's Radical Party in Serbia.

It was one of the founders of the Serbo-Croat coalition (1905) that governed the Kingdom of Croatia-Slavonia, but it left the Coalition soon afterwards.

In 1918, it had two representatives in the National Council of Slovenes, Croats and Serbs.

References

Sources

 
 

Political parties in Austria-Hungary
History of the Serbs of Croatia
Austro-Hungarian Serbs
Ethnic organizations based in Austria-Hungary
Radical parties